Mount Tidighin, Jbel Tidighin, Adrar N Tidighin, is a mountain in Al Hoceïma Province, Tanger-Tetouan-Al Hoceima, Morocco. Its summit elevation is 2,456 m.

Geography
The Tidirhine is the highest mountain of the Rif Range. It is an ultra-prominent peak that rises above the town of Ketama, now known as Issaguen, in an area known for the hospitality of the local Berber people, as well as for cannabis cultivation. It is located 320 km to the north of Morocco's geographical centre and 232 km northeast of the capital Rabat.

References

External links
Picture
Topographic map of Jbel Tidirhine
Jbel Tidighine, the roof of the Rif

Mountains of Morocco
Geography of Tanger-Tetouan-Al Hoceima